Asoka Nalanda Abeygunawardana (born 12 December 1963) (known as Asoka Abeygunawardana) is a Sri Lankan. He is an Electrical Engineer, environmentalist, social activist and the current Chairman  / CEO of the Strategic Enterprise Management Agency at Presidential Secretariat, Sri Lanka

Early life
He was born on 12 December 1963 in to a Sri Lankan political family. Asoka was the eldest son of Henry Dias Abeygunawardana (the first member of parliament Matara electorate in 1948) and his mother was Lakshmi Rani. He has two sisters Deepika & Renuka.

Education
Abeygunawardana completed his primary and secondary education at  St. Aloysius' College Galle, Rahula College Matara and D. S. Senanayake College, Colombo.  He then pursued further studies at the University of Moratuwa, where he earned a Bachelor of Science in Electrical Engineering.

Professional career
He had also served as the Adviser to the Minister of Technology and Research and Adviser to the Minister of Power and Energy, Director Sri Lanka Sustainable Energy Authority, Director Sri Lanka Energies, Executive Director Energy Forum (Guarantee) Limited.

Bibliography
The Revolution of the Era 
A world without Coal or Oil - published in 2008
Feed-in-tariff in Sri Lanka 2012 
Future Challenges of Electricity Planning
Gliricidia- Fourth Plantation Crop of Sri Lanka
Feed in tariff in Sri Lanka

Family
He is married to Wijayanthi Abeygunawardana and have one daughter Amaya.

References

External links
Team at Strategic Enterprise Management Agency (SEMA)
Combined efforts of all stakeholders A MUST to achieve SDGs

1963 births
Living people
Sri Lankan Buddhists
Alumni of Rahula College
Alumni of D. S. Senanayake College
Sinhalese engineers